Sankan may refer to:

Samhan, a period in Korean history
Sangan (disambiguation), various places